Hanna Petros, was an Iraqi Chaldean composer and a scholar. He wrote numerous books and treatises on oriental music, Iraqi Maqams and Syriac hymnody. He also established a renowned conservatory in Baghdad.

Life 
Hanna Petros was an ethnic Chaldean, born to a Chaldean Catholic family in Mosul in 1896. After finishing preparatory school, he studied oriental music at the hands of an Ottoman army officer from 1914 to 1918 and was shortly employed at the Ottoman military band in 1918.
He subsequently worked as an instructor for scouting groups in Mosul in 1921. Later in 1924 he was asked to compose music for the Iraqi army's marching bands.

In 1936 he was asked to establish the Baghdad Conservatory which quickly drew musicians who gained fame such as Jamil Bashir and later his brother Munir Bashir. Şerif Muhiddin Targan was later appointed as the conservatory's dean and Hanna Petros continued to play a major role in the conservatory. It was then that he wrote most of his books. Moreover, he often appeared on the national radio to perform some of his musical works.

Hanna Petros died after a heart attack on 1958, and was buried at the Chaldean cemetery in Baghdad.

Works 

Hanna Peros' main attention was concentrated on oriental music, he composed and performed pieces in Iraqi Maqams and Syriac sacral music. He also left many literary works on that field most notably the Principals of Music Theory and The Book of National Anthems.

Discography

As composer/performer 

 Caruzutha d Hasha (Qdom Shapir, Hymn, 1931)
 Geyassa (Hymn, 1931)
 Baydagh d-Ature (National Song, 1931)
 Bmani Mnawnakh (National Song, 1931)

References 

Iraqi musicians
People from Mosul
1869 births
1958 deaths
Iraqi Eastern Catholics
Chaldean Catholics